William Warr, D.D. was an English Anglican priest.

Warr was educated at Trinity College, Cambridge. He was ordained in 1617. He held livings at Welbourn, and was Archdeacon of Leicester from 1631 until his death in 1641

Notes 

Archdeacons of Leicester
17th-century English Anglican priests
Alumni of Trinity College, Cambridge
1641 deaths